"Tu Fotografía" (Your Picture) is the fifth and final single released by Gloria Estefan from her tenth studio album Unwrapped. The single was released as promotional CD singles to radio stations at U.S. and Argentina. The song was written by Peruvian singer-composer Gian Marco.

"Your Picture" and "Tu Fotografía"
Though Gloria always used to change the meaning of the songs in her translations, this one was of the few exceptions, as noted in the song's name. The song talks about memories and the feelings made by only seeing a simple everyday picture.

The song was especially dedicated to the parents of Gloria's husband Emilio Estefan Jr. The people featured in the photograph in the single cover are Emilio Estefan Jr's parents.

The song was performed live at the Billboard Latin Music Awards, where she received a standing ovation for her performance.

Charts
Tu Fotografía

"Tu Fotografía" became on Gloria's twelfth number one song on the Billboard Hot Latin Tracks chart.

Your Picture

Song Awards
Latin Billboard Music Awards

References

External links
Lyrics with English translation

Spanish-language songs
Gloria Estefan songs
2004 singles
Pop ballads
Songs written by Gian Marco
2003 songs
Songs written by Emilio Estefan
Epic Records singles